The Minister for Seniors is a minister of the Government of New South Wales with responsibility for social policy and welfare concerning seniors or the aged in the state of New South Wales, Australia.

The Minister since 21 December 2021 is Mark Coure, who also holds the Multiculturalism portfolio.

The Minister assists the Minister for Families, Communities and Disability Services administer her portfolio through the  Stronger Communities cluster, in particular through the Department of Communities and Justice and a range of other government agencies.

List of ministers

See also

List of New South Wales government agencies

References

Seniors